The Schneefernerkopf is a  peak in the Zugspitze massif in the Alps. It lies at the western end of the Wetterstein chain in the Alps on the border between the German state of Bavaria and the Austrian state of Tyrol. It is the dominant mountain in the Wetterstein, especially when viewed from Ehrwald.

Distinction from the Zugspitze 
Although the Schneefernerkopf may be viewed as the 'second highest mountain in Germany' after the Zugspitze, this depends heavily on the definition of the term 'mountain'. Due to its proximity to the Zugspitze (it has a topographic isolation of 1.7 km) it is questionable whether it can be counted as an independent mountain, or merely as a sub-peak of the  Zugspitze. Either way, its prominence is 176 m. If it is not reckoned as an independent peak, then the claim to the second highest mountain in Germany goes to the Hochwanner (2,746 m), which is clearly separated from the Zugspitze massif by the Rein Valley, Gatterl and Feldernjöchl. The third highest mountain, with a height of 2,713 m, is the Watzmann in the Berchtesgaden Alps.

Base and easiest climb 
The easiest way to climb the Schneefernerkopf is from the Zugspitze ledge or Zugspitzplatt. The path runs over the rest of the Schneeferner or past it to the Schneefernerscharte. Here there is the 'wind hole' (Windloch), a result of weathering, with its view looking down onto Ehrwald. To get to the peak the path crosses the northern shoulder on steps and along a steep path with the aid of steel cables, which follows the Schneefernerkopf Lift, closed in 2003 but not removed. The entire journey takes just under an hour. Sure-footedness and a head for heights are essential.

From the Schneefernerkopf there is an exceptionally challenging downhill ski run, the Neue Welt, descending for almost 2,000 metres, to Ehrwald. It is very exposed, with slopes up to 45° and has an abseil section, that is rated as UIAA grade III.

Sources and maps 
 Stefan Beulke: Alpenvereinsführer Wetterstein, München 1996, 
 Alpenvereinskarte 1:25.000, Blatt 4/2, Wetterstein- und Mieminger Gebirge

Mountains of the Alps
Mountains of Bavaria
Mountains of Tyrol (state)
Wetterstein
Garmisch-Partenkirchen (district)
Two-thousanders of Austria
Two-thousanders of Germany